Jean-Denis Cochin (1 January 1726, in Paris – 3 June 1783, in Paris) was a French Roman Catholic priest, preacher and philanthropist. He founded in 1780 Paris's Hôpital Cochin, as the hospice of Saint-Jacques du Haut Pas, in the rue du Faubourg Saint-Jacques.

Life

His father, Claude-Denis Cochin (died 1786), was known as a botanist. Jean-Denis followed a course of theological studies in the Sorbonne and was graduated with the degree of Doctor. In 1755 he was ordained priest.

The next year he was given charge of the parish of Saint-Jacques-du-Haut-Pas. There he spent his whole life working for the material as well as the spiritual betterment of his people. He won great fame for his preaching.

Cochin is noted especially for his philanthropy. The needs of his own parish suggested the foundation of a hospital. The idea, conceived in 1780, resulted in the completion of a building of which The Sisters of Charity took charge. The inscription on the building, Pauper clamavit et Dominus exaudivit eum, is an index of Cochin's intentions. He devoted his whole fortune to the work. The hospital was inaugurated with thirty-eight beds; today it is a large institution. It was originally called Hôpital Saint-Jacques. In 1801 the General Council of the Paris hospitals gave it the name of its charitable founder, which it still preserves.

Works

His published works include:

Four books of Sunday sermons (Paris, 1786–1808);
"Exhortations on the Feasts, Fasts and Ceremonies of the Church" (Paris, 1778); 
"Retreat Exercises" (Paris, 1778); 
"Spiritual Writings", a posthumous work published by his brother (Paris, 1784).

References

Attribution

1726 births
1783 deaths
18th-century French Roman Catholic priests